Konga Yo is a 1962 French adventure film directed by Yves Allégret. It was entered into the 1962 Cannes Film Festival.

Cast
 Nicole Courcel as Marie
 Jean Lefebvre as Jean
 Sophie M'Bali as Angèle
 Roger Pigaut as Georges

References

External links

1962 films
1960s French-language films
1962 adventure films
Films directed by Yves Allégret
Films set in the Democratic Republic of the Congo
French adventure films
1960s French films